The 4th World Scout Jamboree (Hungarian: 4. Cserkész Világdzsembori), a gathering of Boy Scouts from all over the world, was hosted by Hungary and held from 2 to 13 August 1933. It was attended by 25,792 Scouts, representing 46 different nations and additional territories. They encamped around the Royal Palace in the Royal Forest of Gödöllő, about 11 miles (18 kilometres) from the capital of Budapest.

In attendance
It was the second-to-last Jamboree for the founder of Scouting, Robert Baden-Powell. Baden-Powell and Hungarian head of state, Regent Horthy, addressed the Scouts from the grandstand built to accommodate over 5000 guests during an opening ceremony at the rally ground. Regent Horthy told the Scouts,

The Jamboree Camp Chief was the Chief Scout of Hungary, Count Teleki Pál, a member of the International Committee who had previously been and would later once again become Prime Minister of Hungary. The General Camp Manager was Vitez Kisbarnaki Ferenc Farkas, a general staff officer of the Hungarian Royal Army, who was later appointed the Chief Scout of Hungary upon Teleki Pál's death in 1941.

This event was notable as the first international gathering where Air Scouts were represented, including the famous pilots, László Almásy and Robert Kronfeld. A meeting of Skolta Esperanto Ligo took also place at the Jamboree.

 Countries and territories with contingents of Scouts present included Hungary, Scotland,  Wales, Northern Ireland, the Irish Free State, England, Jamaica, Trinidad, Switzerland, Sweden, Armenia, the Netherlands, Poland, Finland, Czechoslovakia, Estonia, Australia, New Zealand, British Guiana,  Canada, Newfoundland, Ceylon, South Africa, Austria, Romania, Norway, Portugal, Siam, Spain, Haiti, Greece, France, Gibraltar, India, Philippines, United States, Bulgaria, Liechtenstein, Belgium, Syria, Denmark, Iceland, Egypt, Iran, Japan, Malta, Palestine, Rhodesia, the Duchy of Luxemburg, and Russian Emigrant Scouts. They lived in ten sub-camps. The overall encampment was serviced by its own post office, ambulance station, hospital, a steam railroad and station,  an electric local streetcar line with four stations, radio service, 14 km water supply with 9 wells and an air-service.

The Jamboree daily paper, Magyar Cserkész, was printed in Hungarian, English, French and German, with contributions in other languages. Every foreign group at the Jamboree was assigned a "cousin"—a Hungarian Scout who spoke their language and served as translator and guide. They wore on their right arm a white band displaying two interlocked hands embroidered in red. Over their shirt pocket they wore an embroidered patch stating their language specialty, for example, Parle Français, Spricht Deutsch or Speaks English.

During the Jamboree, about 365,000 people including 100,000 from the nearby city of Gödöllő and the surrounding districts visited the Scouts from many nations, seeking "autograms"—autographs—and "change," or to trade clothing, patches, and more.
The total expenditure was 1,660,000 Pengő (~ 332,000 US dollar), total income was  1,668,000 Pengő (~ 333,600 US dollar).

Jamboree symbol: the White Stag

The white stag of Hungarian mythology was the national symbol of Hungary and the official badge of the Jamboree. During the Jamboree, Scouts from the American contingent learned from their Hungarian "cousin" the meaning of the White Stag on their jamboree patch:

Baden-Powell also referred to the symbol of the Hungarian people in his farewell address to the assembled Scouts:

 Among the boys attending was 14-year-old Béla Bánáthy, who met Baden-Powell when he inspected Béla's campsite, and was inspired as an adult to draw on the myth of the white stag from Hungarian mythology when he organized the White Stag Leadership Development Program in Monterey, California in 1958. In Monterey, Béla would meet three other men who had attended the Jamboree: Joseph Szentkirályi (later Americanized as Joseph St. Clair) became Chairman of the Hungarian Language Department at the Army Language School; Paul Ferenc Suján (whose stew was tasted by Baden Powell at that same Jamboree) was also an instructor at the Army Language School; and American Scouter F. Maurice Tripp had become a research scientist and a member of the National Council of the Boy Scouts of America.

At the same time, the newly formed World Association of Girl Guides and Girl Scouts held its first World Camp in Royal Forest of Gödöllő from 25 July to 7 August 1939, and attended by some 5,800 Girl Guides from around the world. They named the camp Pax Ting.

Related events

To commemorate the tenth anniversary of the Jamboree, a statue by sculpture Lőrinc Siklódi of a Boy Scout was erected on 17 October 1943 across from the Guard Barracks in Royal Forest of Gödöllő, Hungary. After the Red Army occupied the country and the Iron Curtain was established, the original statue by sculptor Lőrinc Siklódi was removed in 1948 and the government moved to suppress Scouting. In 1994, after democracy and Scouting was reestablished in Hungary, the community around Gödöllő moved to locate and re-erect the statue.

After a long search, the original statue could not be found, and a committee was established with the purpose of erecting a new statue. They decided to enlarge Zsigmond Kisfaludi Strobl's  statuette entitled The Boy Scout. A student of Kisfaludi Strobl, István Pál, was chosen to complete the work. The new statue of a Boy Scout standing on the original pedestal was unveiled on 23 April 1994, commemorating yet again the 1933 World Jamboree.

In 1993, to celebrate the 60th anniversary of the Fourth World Jamboree, the Hungarian Scout Association Magyar Cserkészszövetség hosted a Fourth World Jamboree Memorial Camp at Bélapátfalva, Hungary.

Teleki Pál, who  served as Camp Chief at the Jamboree, is buried at Gödöllõ. He was Prime Minister of Hungary twice and a friend of Baden-Powell's.

See also
 World Scout Jamboree

References

External links

 Jamboree Histories at Scout.org
 Jamboree Histories at Scoutbase.org
 1933 Jamboree at pinetreeweb.com
 White Stag Leadership Development Program

1933

1933 in Hungary
August 1933 events